Michael Reihs (born 25 April 1979) is a Danish former professional racing cyclist.

Major results

2005
 2nd CSC Classic
 6th GP Herning
 9th Overall Tour du Loir-et-Cher
2006
 3rd La Roue Tourangelle
 6th GP Herning
2007
 2nd Internatie Reningelst
 3rd Boucle de l'Artois
 7th Overall Ronde de l'Oise
 7th GP Herning
2008
 7th Ronde van Overijssel
2009
 2nd Classic Loire Atlantique
 2nd GP Herning
 5th Overall Ronde de l'Oise
 6th GP Bikebuster
 8th Nokere Koerse
 10th Paris–Troyes
 10th Profronde van Fryslan
2010
 1st Stage 6 La Tropicale Amissa Bongo
 4th Rogaland GP
 5th GP Herning
 7th La Roue Tourangelle
 9th Grand Prix de la ville de Pérenchies
2011
 1st Himmerland Rundt
 2nd GP Herning
 3rd Road race, National Road Championships
 6th Tartu GP
2012
 5th Himmerland Rundt
2013
 9th GP Herning
2015
 6th GP Horsens
2016
 8th GP Horsens

References

External links
 

1979 births
Living people
Danish male cyclists
People from Silkeborg
Sportspeople from the Central Denmark Region